Oscar Cyrillo Carregal (born 14 April 1898, date of death unknown) was a Brazilian footballer. He played in one match for the Brazil national football team in 1919. He was also part of Brazil's squad for the 1919 South American Championship.

References

External links
 

1898 births
Year of death missing
Brazilian footballers
Brazil international footballers
Sportspeople from Niterói
Association football forwards
CR Flamengo footballers